Laki is a small village located in the southern part of Mizoram, India. It falls under the jurisdiction of the Siaha district. The population was approximately 1,012 in 2011.

References

Villages in Saiha district